Daryl Anderson (born July 1, 1951) is an American television actor.

Biography
Anderson was born in Seattle, Washington, the son of Shirley (née Gallagher) and Donald Anderson. He began acting in high school and at age 19 joined A Contemporary Theatre in Seattle as box office manager.  He started acting professionally in 1972.  He received a BFA from the University of Washington School of Drama.

Anderson made his film debut in Sweet Revenge in 1976.  He is best known for the role of photographer Dennis Price, whose nickname was The Animal, in the television series Lou Grant from 1977 to 1982.  The slovenly character was controversial among photographic professionals. Early in the series' run, the Professional Photographers Association of America demanded that the Animal character be eliminated.  However, the National Press Photographers Association found that the series and Anderson's character had sparked interest in many young people in entering the profession.

The Associated Press wire carried a photograph he took of a major fire near a Lou Grant filming location in Los Angeles.  The photo appeared in hundreds of newspapers. The C. E. Rynd Photographic Fine Arts gallery in Seattle hosted an exhibit of his photography in 1988.

In 1984, Anderson married actress Kathy Connell. Since 1995, they have served as producers of the annual Screen Actors Guild Awards.  Anderson was an officer of SAG from 1980 to 2002. Anderson continues to pursue acting and voiceover work in television in Los Angeles. His first audiobook narration was released in late 2006.

References

External links 
Personal site

Lou Grant episode guide

1951 births
American male film actors
American male television actors
Male actors from Seattle
Living people
University of Washington School of Drama alumni